Cyril Northcote Parkinson (1909–1993) was a British naval historian and author of some 60 books, the most famous of which was his best-seller Parkinson's Law (1957), in which he advanced Parkinson's law, stating that "work expands so as to fill the time available for its completion".

This bibliography covers writing about Parkinson.
Baistow, Tom. "PARKINSON'S SECOND LAW." The Singapore Free Press 30 Mar. 1960: 6. Print
Parkinson, Cyril Northcote. "THE ART OF BEING NO.2 IN THE OFFICE." The Singapore Free Press 17 Oct. 1961: 6. Print.
"General Knowledge Quiz." The Singapore Free Press 23 Oct. 1961: 9. Print: "3. Who wrote Parkinson's Law? What connection did the author have with Singapore?"
"THE MALE AND FEMALE FIRMS - BY PARKINSON. Reuters." The Straits Times [Singapore] 3 Mar. 1962: 1. Print
"STOP-GO ECONOMY BY PARKINSON. The Straits Times [Singapore] 19 Mar. 1962: 10. Print
"Bill to amend constitution." The Straits Times [Singapore] 10 Jul. 1964: 20. Print
"Car insurance poser for the 'innocent' victim." The Straits Times [Singapore] 11 Jul. 1964: 15. Print
Geldard, Geoffrey. "The 'small-minded' Opposition: Chief Minister hits out." The Straits Times [Singapore] 17 Dec. 1966: 17. Print
"THE U.N. TRIES AGAIN." The Straits Times [Singapore] 16 Sep. 1970: 10. Print
"A Fiction." The Straits Times [Singapore] 14 Dec. 1970: 20. Print
"PAPER PAPER PAPER BACKS." New Nation [Singapore] 3 Jul. 1971: 9. Print
Sheppard, Trish. "Into the antique business by accident." New Nation [Singapore] 15 Sep. 1971: 7. Print
"PAPER PAPER PAPER BACKS." New Nation [Singapore] 16 Oct. 1971: 9. Print
Sheppard, Trish. "Helping those who live in a world of their own (in three parts)." New Nation [Singapore] 9—11 May 1972: 9. Print
"Talks to forge Asean link-up with EEC." The Straits Times [Singapore] 7 Jun. 1972: 15. Print
Holmberg, Judith. "Parkinson's 'law'" New Nation [Singapore] 19 Dec. 1973: 4. Print
Wilson, Dick. "TOWARDS A WORLD OF TRIBES." New Nation [Singapore] 23 Oct. 1974: 10. Print
"Danes learn to adjust welfare state to rule of necessity." The Straits Times [Singapore] 13 Apr. 1975: 24. Print
"Be thankful for our bureaucracy: PM." The Straits Times 17 Mar. 1976: 6. Print
The Straits Times [Singapore] 12 Nov. 1976: 16. Print
"SEARCHING FOR THE CURE. New Nation {Singapore] 16 Aug. 1977: 10, 11. Print
"Once upon a time, he'd very little to do. The Business Times [Singapore] 10 Dec. 1977: 11. Print
"Professor Parkinson's Law comes of age. NYT" The Business Times [Singapore] 21 Jun. 1978: 7. Print
"Professor Parkinson's Law comes of age. NYT" New Nation [Singapore] 24 Jun. 1978: 9. Print
Yap, Sonny. "Disney setting for crystal-ball gazing into Tomorrowland." New Nation [Singapore] 29 Sep. 1978: 9. Print
"Full marks for the full day. New Nation [Singapore] 8 Dec. 1978: 8. Print
Tho, Thian-Ser. "Thatcher changing welfare state to working system." The Straits Times [Singapore] 29 Oct. 1979: 16. Print
"Another new law from Parkinson. Reuters." The Business Times [Singapore] 19 Nov. 1979: 12. Print
"Parkinson's latest law. New Nation [Singapore] 19 Nov. 1979: 13. Print
"Singapore 1128. This shows policy is inconsistent." The Straits Times [Singapore] 3 Jan. 1980: 13. Print
"The Prof lays down the law again." New Nation [Singapore] 11 Jan. 1980: 8. Print
"Progress based entirely on performance." The Straits Times [Singapore] 30 Jan. 1980: 17. Print
"'She's the answer to strikes.' AFP." New Nation [Singapore] 18 Mar. 1980: 7. Print
"No 30 per cent answers." New Nation [Singapore] 21 Mar. 1980: 8. Print
"BOOKS I." The Straits Times [Singapore] 14 Jun. 1980: 1. Print
"The amazing art of getting things done.: New Nation [Singapore] 5 Mar. 1981: 29. Print
Simpson, Gavin. "Don't be blinkered by a job, says prof." New Nation[Singapore] 7 Jul. 1981: 9. Print
Chew, Robert. "Japan's Occupation bureaucracy studied. The Straits Times [Singapore] 3 Oct. 1981: 8. Print
"BOGAARS." The Straits Times [Singapore] 26 Oct. 1981: 12. Print
"Oberst's Law." New Nation [Singapore] 12 Nov. 1981: 2. Print
"Talking turkey. New Nation [Singapore] 3 Dec. 1981: 40. Print
Colverd, Gerald. "PREDATOR PRIZES. The Business Times [Singapore] 28 Dec. 1981: 9. Print
Tan, Suan-Ann. "History come-alive." The Straits Times [Singapore] 23 Jan. 1982: 1-2. Print
"Parkinson's story." The Straits Times [Singapore] 23 Jan. 1982: 7. Print
"Minister's reading list. The Straits Times [Singapore] 30 May 1982: 4. Print
Koh, Tse-Ying. "Getting along with people." The Business Times [Singapore] 4 Oct. 1982: 2. Print
Chew, Robert. "The other side of Japan." The Straits Times [Singapore] 20 Nov. 1982: 6. Print
Lee, Geok Boi. "Queue up, get ready for the hassle." The Straits Times [Singapore] 13 Mar. 1983: 3. Print
Colverd, Gerald. "Parkinson's law." The Business Times [Singapore] 20 Jun. 1983: 11. Print
"Murphy's Law as explained through science." The Straits Times [Singapore] 12 Sep. 1983: 16. Print]
"The Straits Times says... Parkinson's law." The Straits Times [Singapore] 8 Oct. 1983: 18. Print
Lee, Yoke-Meng. "One illustration too many." The Business Times [Singapore] 17 Oct. 1983: 8. Print
"Your Viewing And Listening Guide. SBC 5." The Straits Times [Singapore] 28 Jan. 1984: 24. Print: "8.40pm. Management - Parkinson's Law and the PeterPrinciple (Last episode/Chinese subtitles): The dangers and negative mechanisms of bureaucracy are discussed."
Gwee, Monica. "Speak, listen or sink." The Business Times [Singapore] 19 Mar. 1984: 2. Print
Ho, Chin-Beng. "How you can manage with humour and ease." The Straits Times [Singapore] 24 Mar. 1984: 7. Print
"When one head is better than 20."  Singapore Monitor 21 Jun. 1985: 14. Print
"When one head is better than 20." Singapore Monitor (Afternoon Edition) 21 Jun 1985: 14. Print
Hoe, Irene. "Now for a word — or two or three — from your MPs." The Straits Times [Singapore] 26 Feb. 1986: 11. Print
Pates, Irene. "It's all in a day's work." The Straits Times [Singapore] 29 Jul. 1986: 1. Print
Thio, Lay-Hoon. "New Arrivals." The Straits Times [Singapore] 22 Nov. 1986: 8. Print
"High-tech free time: Boredom need not follow. The Economist." The Straits Times [Singapore] 16 May 1987: 18. Print
King, John Leonard (Baron King of Wartnaby). "Privatisation: the British Airways experience." The Business Times [Singapore] 27 Jul. 1987: 3. Print
"Parkinson'sLaw." The Straits Times [Singapore] 10 Oct. 1987: 2. Print
"At 78, essayist Parkinson is still laying down the laws. NYT." The Straits Times [Singapore] 10 Oct. 1987: 2. Print
Smith, D. J. "Beware of pastoral school system." The New Paper [Singapore] 3 Oct. 1988: 9. Print
"Firma sebenarnya satu organisasi." Berita Harian [Singapore] 16 Jan. 1989: 5. Print. [Malay]
"Where to, Mr President? From the Economist." The Straits Times [Singapore] 16 Mar. 1989: 23. Print
Leong, Chan-Teik. "Traffic flow at 15 kmh if vehicle growth not curbed." The Straits Times [Singapore] 6 Oct. 1992: 20. Print
Chan, Caroline and Robert Ng. "Stockbroking houses likely to pay out modest bonuses this year." The Straits Times [Singapore] 22 Dec. 1992: 40. Print
"Man behind Parkinson's Law dies, aged 83. Reuters." The Straits Times [Singapore] 12 Mar. 1993: 6. Print
"Reformers must fight Japan's bureaucracy." The Straits Times [Singapore] 1 Oct. 1993: 35. Print
"Elak gejala 'Parkinson.'" Berita Harian [Singapore] 26 Mar. 1994: 4. Print. [Malay]
Hadar, Leon. "Promoting underdevelopment." The Business Times [Singapore] 26 Apr. 1994: 16. Print
Ahmad, H. U. "Transforming Third World bureaucracy." The Business Times [Singapore] 30 Apr. 1994: 19. Print
"Attempting a record in a race against time." The Straits Times [Singapore] 8 Jul. 1995: 2. Print
Ancient Chinese examination system made relevant." The Straits Times [Singapore] 16 Mar. 1996: 24. Print
Tan, Suan-Ann. "Children live up to expectations, not IQ tests. The Straits Times [Singapore] 23 Nov. 2000: 26. Print
"Long lazy life. Today [Singapore] 30 Apr. 2001: 14. Print
"Govt bodies are well monitored. The Business Times [Singapore] 3 Sep. 2002: 8. Print
"Stop wasting time." The Straits Times [Singapore] 17 Oct. 2006: 22. Print
Today [Singapore] 18 Nov. 2006: 4. Print
"Every minute counts." The Straits Times [Singapore] 3 Dec. 2007: 74. Print

References

C. Northcote Parkinson
Parkinson